Menegazzia kawesqarica is a species of foliose lichen found in southern South America. It was formally described as a new species in 2001 by lichenologists Jarle Bjerke and Arve Elvebakk. The type specimen was collected by the second author in a depression of a volcanic rock outcrop in Morro Chico (Magallanes Province, Chile). The lichen contains atranorin, stictic acid, cryptostictic acid, menegazziaic acid, and constictic acid as lichen products.

See also
 List of Menegazzia species

References

kawesqarica
Lichen species
Lichens described in 2001
Lichens of southern South America
Taxa named by Arve Elvebakk